Godley Toll Bar railway station was a short-lived station between Manchester and Hyde on the Woodhead Route, existing only between November 1841 and December 1842. It was replaced by Godley East which closed in 1995.

History

Not much is documented about the station. Only through mentions of it opening and closing in 1841–1842. The line is still in use between Manchester, Glossop and Hadfield. No trace remains of the station.

References

External links
https://glossopheritage.co.uk/ghtarchive/railways/

Disused railway stations in Greater Manchester
Former Great Central Railway stations
Railway stations in Great Britain opened in 1841
Railway stations in Great Britain closed in 1842